Singapore is a parliamentary representative democratic republic whereby the president of Singapore is the head of state, the prime minister of Singapore is the head of government, and of a multi-party system. Executive power is exercised by the Cabinet from the parliament, and to a lesser extent, the president. Cabinet has the general direction and control of the government and is accountable to Parliament. There are three separate branches of government: the legislature, executive and judiciary abiding by the Westminster system. Singapore has been described as being a de facto one-party state.

Legislative power is vested in both the government and the Parliament of Singapore. The legislature is the parliament, which consists of the president as its head and a single chamber whose members are elected by popular vote. The role of the president as the head of state has been, historically, largely ceremonial although the constitution was amended in 1991 to give the president some veto powers in a few key decisions such as the use of the national reserves and the appointment of key judiciary, Civil Service and Singapore Armed Forces posts. They also exercise powers over civil service appointments and national security matters.

Political background
Singaporean politics have been dominated by the People's Action Party (PAP) since the 1959 general election when Lee Kuan Yew became Singapore's first prime minister (Singapore was then a self-governing state within the British Empire). The PAP has been the only ruling party to form the government since then. Singapore joined the Federation of Malaysia in 1963 and gained independence in 1965 after being expelled.

Singapore has consistently been rated as the least-corrupt country in Asia and amongst the top ten cleanest in the world by Transparency International. The World Bank's governance indicators have also rated Singapore highly on rule of law, control of corruption and government effectiveness. However, it is widely perceived that some aspects of the political process, civil liberties, and political and human rights are lacking.  Freedom House deemed the press "not free" in 2015.

Political climate

Domination of the ruling party
The Workers' Party (WP) is the leading opposition party. WP took 10 of the 93 parliamentary seats in the 2020 election, while the PAP won the other 83. Another new opposition party, the Progress Singapore Party (PSP), obtained two NCMP seats in the 2020 election.

One commonly cited reason for a lack of opposition in Singapore is the use of defamation lawsuits by the PAP to bankrupt political opponents and disqualify them from running for office when accusations were made against the ruling party. Cases include former leader of the WP J. B. Jeyaretnam and leader of the Singapore Democratic Party (SDP) Chee Soon Juan, who were bankrupted in 2001 and 2011 respectively.

Another reason given is the pursuit of legal action against journalists and bloggers critical of the PAP and its policies. Reporters Without Borders cites such lawsuits, along with attempts at making critical journalists unemployable, among its concerns when ranking the country 151st in the world for press freedom in 2017.

The PAP has in the past threatened voters by saying that constituencies voting for opposition MPs would be put at the bottom of the list for public housing programs. In 1998, then PAP secretary-general, Goh Chok Tong said, "By linking the priority of upgrading to electoral support, we focus the minds of voters on the link between upgrading and the people whose policies make it possible. This has the desired result.". As recently as 2011 Lee Hsien Loong expressed that there has to be a distinction between opposition wards and the ones that voted for the PAP in terms of housing upgrades.

The boundaries of electoral constituencies in Singapore are decided by the Elections Department, which is under the control of the Prime Minister's Office. Electoral boundaries are redrawn just a few days before the general election. There have been accusations of gerrymandering via dissolving of constituencies with relatively stronger opposition support, such as the Cheng San Group Representation Constituency (GRC).

Human rights condition

Although Singapore's laws are inherited from British and British Indian laws, including many elements of English common law, the PAP has also consistently rejected liberal democratic values, which it typifies as Western and states that there should not be a 'one-size-fits-all' solution to a democracy. Laws restricting the freedom of speech exist to prohibit speech that may breed ill will or cause disharmony within Singapore's multiracial, multi-religious society. For example, in September 2005, three bloggers were convicted of sedition for posting racist remarks targeting minorities.

Some offences can lead to heavy fines or caning and there are laws which allow capital punishment in Singapore for murder and drug trafficking.

Executive

 He or she must not be a member of any political party on the date of his or her nomination for election.
 He or she must have for a period of not less than three years held office —
 as Minister, Chief Justice, Speaker, Attorney-General, Chairman of the Public Service Commission, Auditor-General, Accountant-General or Permanent Secretary;
 as chief executive officer (CEO) of a key statutory board or government company: the Central Provident Fund Board, the Housing and Development Board, the Jurong Town Corporation, the Monetary Authority of Singapore, Temasek Holdings, or GIC Private Limited (formerly known as the Government of Singapore Investment Corporation);
 as CEO of a company with an average of $500 million in shareholders' equity for the most recent three years in that office, and which is profitable after taxes; or
 in any other similar or comparable position of seniority and responsibility in any other organisation or department of equivalent size or complexity in the public or private sector which has given him or her such experience and ability in administering and managing financial affairs as to enable him or her to carry out effectively the functions and duties of the office of President.

The president now exercises powers over the following:
appointment of public officers
government budgets
examine government's exercise of its powers under the Internal Security Act
examine government's exercise of its powers under religious harmony laws
investigate cases of corruption

However, the president must consult the Council of Presidential Advisers before he or she takes a decision on some of these matters. The council comprises:
two members appointed at the personal discretion of the president
two members appointed by the president on the advice of the prime minister
one member appointed by the president on the advice of the chief justice
one member appointed by the president on the advice of the chairman of the Public Service Commission
A member of the council serves a six-year term and is eligible for re-appointment for further terms of four years each.

Similar to the Speech from the Throne given by the heads of state in other parliamentary systems, the president delivers an address written by the government at the opening of parliament about what kind of policies to expect in the coming year. The current president is Halimah Yacob.

Cabinet

The cabinet forms the executive of the government and it is answerable to parliament. It consist of sitting members of parliament and is headed by a prime minister, the head of government. The current prime minister is Lee Hsien Loong.

Neither the prime minister nor members of the cabinet are elected by parliament. The prime minister is appointed by the president, then Cabinet members, also known as ministers, are appointed by the president on the advice of the prime minister.

The cabinet in Singapore collectively decides the government's policies and has influence over lawmaking by introducing bills.

Ministers in Singapore are the highest paid politicians in the world, receiving a 60% salary raise in 2007 and as a result Prime Minister Lee Hsien Loong's pay jumped to S$3.1 million, five times the US$400,000 earned by US President Barack Obama. Although there was a public outcry regarding the high salary in comparison to the size of the country governed, the government's firm stance was that this raise was required to ensure the continued efficiency and corruption-free status of Singapore's "world-class" government. On 21 May 2011, following the 2011 general election, the Prime Minister announced that a committee would be appointed to review politicians' remuneration, and that revised salaries would take effect from that date.

Legislative

Parliament

The unicameral Singaporean parliament is the legislature in Singapore with the president as its head. Before independence in 1965, it was known as the Legislative Assembly. It currently consists of 93 members of parliament. The maximum term of any one parliament is five years, after which a general election must be held within three months of the dissolution of parliament.

The 93 elected members of parliament (MPs) are elected on a plurality voting basis and represent either single-member constituencies (SMCs) or group representation constituencies (GRCs). In GRCs, political parties field a team of between three and six candidates. At least one candidate in the team must belong to a minority race.

Formerly, there were no GRCs, and all constituencies of Singapore were represented by one member, but amendments to the Parliamentary Elections Act in 1991 led to the creation of GRCs, thus creating a plurality voting system in the process.

This development has led to complaints from opposition parties that they are often unable to field one, let alone three or more candidates. Out of the 93 members of parliament, 26 are female. In the 2001 and 2006 general election, the incumbent People's Action Party (PAP) won the same configuration of 82 out of the 84 seats. The final results of the 2020 general election saw a 8.62% swing against the PAP from the 2015 elections of 69.86%.

The constitution also provides for the appointment of other members of parliament not voted in at an election. Up to six non-constituency members of parliament from the opposition political parties can be appointed. Currently, there are two non-constituency members of parliament.

A constitutional provision for the appointment of up to nine nominated members of parliament (NMPs) was made in 1990. NMPs are appointed by the president for a term of two and a half years on the recommendation of a select committee chaired by the speaker of Parliament and are not connected to any political parties. The youngest NMP to be sworn into parliament was 26 years old, Yip Pin Xiu.

In 2018, nine NMPs were sworn in, out of which five were female.

Both non-constituency and nominated members of parliament cannot vote on the following issues:
amendment of the constitution
public funds
vote of no confidence in the government
removing the president from office

Legislative process
Before any law is passed, it is first introduced in parliament as a draft known as a bill. Bills are usually introduced by a minister on behalf of the cabinet, known as government bills. However, any member of parliament can introduce a bill, known as a private member's bill. All bills must go through three readings in parliament and receive the president's assent to become an act of Parliament.

Each bill goes through several stages before it becomes a law. The first stage is a mere formality known as the first reading, where it is introduced without a debate. This is followed by the second reading, where members of parliament debate on the general principles of the bill. If parliament opposes the bill, it may vote to reject the bill.

If the bill goes through the second reading, the bill is sent to a select committee where every clause in the bill is examined. Members of parliament who support the bill in principle but do not agree with certain clauses can propose amendments to those clauses at this stage. Following its report back to parliament, the bill will go through its third reading where only minor amendments will be allowed before it is passed.

Most bills passed by parliament are scrutinised by the Presidential Council for Minority Rights which makes a report to the speaker of Parliament stating whether there are clauses in a bill which affects any racial or religious community. If approved by the council, the bill will be presented for the president's assent.

The last stage involves the granting of assent by the president, before the bill officially becomes a law.

Constitution

The Constitution of Singapore is the supreme law of Singapore and it is a codified constitution.

The constitution cannot be amended without the support of more than two-thirds of the members of parliament on the second and third readings. The president may seek opinion on constitutional issues from a tribunal consisting of not less than three judges of the Supreme Court. Singaporean courts, like the courts in Australia, cannot offer advisory opinion on the constitutionality of laws.

Part IV of the constitution guarantees the following:
liberty of a person
prohibition of slavery and forced labour
protection against retrospective criminal laws and repeated trials
equal protection
prohibition of banishment and freedom of movement
freedom of speech, assembly and association
freedom of religion
right to education

The sections on liberty of the person and freedoms of speech, assembly, movement, association and religion are all qualified by allowing Parliament to restrict those freedoms for reasons including national security, public health, and "public order or morality". In practice, the courts have given complete discretion to the government in imposing such restrictions.

Part XII of the constitution allows the Parliament of Singapore to enact legislation designed to stop or prevent subversion. Such legislation is valid even if it is inconsistent with Part IV of the constitution. The Internal Security Act (ISA) is a legislation under such provision. In 1966, Chia Thye Poh was detained under the ISA and was imprisoned for 23 years without trial. Afterwards, he was placed under conditions of house arrest for another nine years.

Judiciary

Elections and political parties

Voting has been compulsory in Singapore since 1959 and there is universal suffrage. The legal voting age is 21. The Elections Department of Singapore is responsible for the planning, preparation and conduct of presidential and parliamentary elections and of any national referendum in Singapore. It is a department under the Prime Minister's Office.

Paper ballots are still used in Singapore. However, there is a concern that voting secrecy might be compromised as ballot papers have serial numbers on them. As stated in the Elections Department website:

 ballot papers can be examined only under strict conditions, and there are safeguards that make it extremely difficult to find out how any particular voter voted. After the count, all ballot papers and their counterfoils have to be sealed in the Supreme Court vault for six months, after which all the ballot papers and other election documents are destroyed. During those six months, these documents can only be retrieved by court order. The court will issue such an order only if it is satisfied that a vote has been fraudulently cast and the result of the election may be affected as a result. Our courts have issued no such order since elections have been held here since 1948.

People's Action Party
The PAP has been the dominant political party in Singapore, re-elected continuously since 1959. It is headed by Lee Hsien Loong, who succeeded Goh Chok Tong. Goh's predecessor Lee Kuan Yew served as Singapore's prime minister from independence through 1990. Since stepping down as prime minister, Lee remained influential as Senior Minister and Minister Mentor.

PAP has held the overwhelming majority of seats in parliament since 1966 when the opposition Barisan Sosialis Party resigned from parliament and left the PAP as the sole representative party. PAP won all of the seats in an expanding parliament in the general elections of 1968, 1972, 1976 and 1980. PAP's share of the popular vote in contested seats declined from 78% in 1980 to 65% in 1997. However, the elections of 2001 saw the party's share of the popular vote climb to 75%, winning 82 of the 84 seats. The 2006 Singapore general election marked the first time since 1988 the PAP did not return to power on nomination day, with the opposition parties fielding candidates in over half of the constituencies. Overall PAP saw its share of the vote fall to 66.6%.

The dominance of the PAP, often to the extent that there is no effective opposition, has led to Singapore being described as a one-party state.

Opposition parties
There are two opposition parties in the 14th Parliament of Singapore as of 2020 - The Workers' Party and the Progress Singapore Party.

There are other major opposition parties such as the Singapore People's Party, Reform Party, and the Singapore Democratic Party (SDP), that do not hold a seat in parliament. J.B. Jeyaretnam of the Workers' Party became the first opposition party member of parliament in 15 years when he won a 1981 by-election. Despite acquiring an increasing percentage of the popular vote—34% overall in 2006—opposition parties gained small numbers of seats in the general elections of 1984 (2 seats of 79), 1988 (1 seat of 81), 1991 (4 seats of 81), 1997 (2 seats of 83) and 2001 (2 seats of 84). The opposition parties attribute the disproportionate results to the nature of the GRC system.

As of July 2020, the Worker's Party holds 10 of 93 elected seats while Progress Singapore Party holds the remaining 2 Non-constituency MP (NCMP) seats.

Women's participation in politics

Women traditionally played a significantly smaller role than their male counterparts in Singapore. Nonetheless, in recent years, there is an increasing level of female participation in the Singapore political arena.

On 11 July 2020, He Ting Ru and Raeesah Begum Farid Khan became the third and fourth woman from an opposition party to win a seat in parliament by 4,922 votes over the ruling party's candidates in the 2020 general election for Sengkang Group Representation Constituency(GRC). The team was led by He Ting Ru and was first timer Raeesah Khan who proceeded to become the youngest MP in Singapore's Parliamentary history.

Lee Li Lian was the second woman from an opposition party to win a seat in Parliament with 54.50% of the votes but lost in the following 2015 general election by a slim margin. Sylvia Lim Swee Lian, currently the Chairperson of the opposition Workers' Party (WP) and Member of Parliament (MP) representing Aljunied GRC whose team won 54.71% of the votes (54.72% including overseas votes), was the first time that an opposition party won a GRC since the system's introduction on 1 June 1988.

In September 2017, Halimah Yacob was inaugurated as Singapore's first woman President, the only candidate certified as eligible in the election.

Shirt colours

The candidates and supporters of the various political parties tend to wear the following shirt colours while making their rounds in various wards or campaigning.

See also

 Dominant party system
 Laws of Singapore
 Corruption in Singapore
 Lists of members of parliament in Singapore

References 

 
Singapore

bn:সিঙ্গাপুর#রাজনীতি